is a railway station operated by West Japan Railway Company (JR West) and Nankai Electric Railway.  is a stop on the Hankai Tramway Hankai Line.

This station is located near  on the Midosuji and Sakaisuji lines of the Osaka Metro, but no physical connection exists between the two stations.

Lines
Shin-Imamiya Station
 West Japan Railway Company (JR West)
 Osaka Loop Line
 Kansai Main Line (Yamatoji Line)
 Nankai Electric Railway (NK03)
 Nankai Main Line
 Koya Line
Shin-Imamiya-Ekimae Station
 Hankai Tramway Hankai Line (HN52)
Dobutsuen-mae Station
 Osaka Metro
 Midosuji Line (M22)
 Sakaisuji Line (K19)

JR West Shin-Imamiya Station

Layout
 Two island platforms serving four tracks.

The Osaka Loop Line clockwise trains depart from the following tracks.
Local trains from Tsuruhashi: all from Track 4
Through trains from the Yamatoji Line: mainly from Track 4
Through trains from the Hanwa Line: mainly from Track 3 (Direct rapid services from Track 4)

Adjacent stations

History 
Station numbering was introduced in March 2018 with Shin-Imamiya being assigned station number JR-Q19 for the Yamatoji Line and JR-O19 for the Osaka Loop Line.

Nankai Railway Shin-Imamiya Station

Layout
One island platform and two side platforms serving four tracks.

Adjacent stations

Hankai Tramway Shin-Imamiya-Ekimae Station

Shin-Imamiya-Ekimae Station was called  until the renaming on December 1, 2014.

Layout
The station has two side platforms serving a track each.

Adjacent stations

Surrounding area
Shinsekai
Tsutenkaku
Jan Jan Yokocho
SpaWorld
Imamiya-ebisu
Tennoji Park, Tennoji Zoo
Kamagasaki
Tobita Shinchi

See also
 List of railway stations in Japan

References

External links
 JR West station information 
 Nankai Electric Railway station information 

Railway stations in Japan opened in 1911
Railway stations in Japan opened in 1966
Railway stations in Japan opened in 1964
Railway stations in Osaka Prefecture
Railway stations in Osaka
Osaka Loop Line